The Ozark Eagles were a Minor League Baseball team that represented Ozark, Alabama in the Alabama State League and Alabama–Florida League from 1946 to 1952.

External links
Baseball Reference

Baseball teams established in 1946
Sports clubs disestablished in 1952
Professional baseball teams in Alabama
Defunct Alabama-Florida League teams
Defunct Alabama State League teams
1946 establishments in Alabama
1952 disestablishments in Alabama
Dale County, Alabama
Defunct baseball teams in Alabama
Baseball teams disestablished in 1952
Alabama State League teams